Jacqueline Milczarek was a Canadian news anchor for CTV News Channel broadcasting on weekend afternoons. She started working for CTV News in 2007. Before she joined CTV News, Milczarek was a reporter and part-time anchor to Global TV's First National with Peter Kent.  She has earned two RTNDA Awards for coverage of Pope John Paul's visit to Canada during the World Youth Day in 2002 as well as for a story about a man who recovered from a coma. Milczarek graduated from Ryerson Polytechnical Institute.

Milczarek created some controversy for her comments during a debate about "ethical oil" and using the Athabasca oil sands over Saudi Arabia's oil. When discussing CTV's refusing to air an ad by Ethical Oil Institute (an oil sands advocacy group) describing women's rights in Saudi Arabia; Milczarek asked "Are we really more ethical than the Saudis?" Milczarek later tweeted she was referring to Canada supporting the Saudi government, although it was questioned if she was forced to make these comments based on CTV's parent company, Bell Canada, large volume of work building the Saudi's telephone infrastructure. CTV and Bell laid her off in 2014.   She no longer works at CTV News but as a reporter and host of CPAC- than cable political Canadian news network

References

Year of birth missing (living people)
Living people
Canadian television news anchors
Toronto Metropolitan University alumni
Canadian women television journalists